Garry Neill Kennedy,  (6 November 1935 – 8 August 2021) was a Canadian conceptual artist and educator from Halifax, Nova Scotia. In the mid-1970s, he created works that investigated the processes and materials of painting. In the first decade of the 2000s, he expanded his work to investigate art and its social, institutional, and political framework.

Life 
Kennedy was born in St. Catharines, Ontario. He studied at the Ontario College of Art (1960) and then earned his Bachelor of Fine Arts from the University at Buffalo. He completed his Master of Fine Arts at the University of Ohio in 1965. Kennedy went on to teach in, and head, the fine art department of Northland College in Ashland, Wisconsin. In 1967, at the age of 32, he was appointed president of the Nova Scotia College of Art and Design, the youngest ever to serve in that position. He was president of the college for 23 years, till 2000. Kennedy died in Vancouver, BC on August 8, 2021, after years of battling dementia.

Work
Kennedy has been called a "near-legendary figure in the Canadian conceptual art scene" for his contributions to this area in both his art practice and as head of NSCAD. His main artistic practice in the 2000s was based on the criticism of institutional power, ranging from office politics to corporate greed and government authority.

His solo exhibitions include such venues as the Art Gallery of Ontario, the Art Gallery of Nova Scotia, the National Gallery of Canada, the 49th Parallel Gallery (New York), the Tasmanian School of Art Gallery (Hobart, Australia), Galeri II (Reykjavik, Iceland), Portikus (Frankfurt) and numerous others. In 2000, a major show Garry Neill Kennedy: Work of Four Decades, was organized and circulated by the Art Gallery of Nova Scotia in partnership with the National Gallery of Canada. In 2017, the MacKenzie Art Gallery in Regina held Garry Neill Kennedy: Ya ummi Ya ummi curated by Timothy Long. In 2018, his exhibition Remembering Names was held at the CSA Space, Vancouver. It was a project conceived in the early 1970s, and repeated several times in the following decades, in which he attempted to recall and record the names of people he has met since childhood. In 2020, Garry Neill Kennedy: The Big Five, in which he reassigned the colour schemes of the corporate logos of the five biggest banks in Canada, was exhibited at the Victoria Arts Council Gallery in Victoria, B.C.  (it had been previously shown at the Emerson Gallery in Berlin). He has been included in over twenty group exhibitions at such galleries and museums as The Museum of Modern Art, New York; the National Gallery of Canada, Ottawa; the Art Gallery of Ontario, Toronto; Art Cologne; and the Art Gallery of Contemporary Art, Vancouver.

Public collections which hold his work include the Museum of Modern Art, the Art Gallery of Ontario, the National Gallery of Canada, the Vancouver Art Gallery, the Glenbow Museum, and the Owens Art Gallery, Sackville, NB.

Awards
Kennedy was awarded the Portia White Prize by the Arts Council of Nova Scotia in 2000. In 2004, Kennedy received a Governor General's Award in Visual and Media Arts. His jury citation called him "one of the most distinguished figures in Canadian art. Not only has he produced a body of conceptual painting that is recognized internationally, he was also instrumental in establishing an international reputation for the Nova Scotia College of Art and Design, of which he was the innovative head for 23 years." In 2004, Kennedy was invested as a Member of the Order of Canada by Governor General Adrienne Clarkson for his contributions as an administrator, educator and artist, enriching Canada's cultural legacy. In 2011, he received a Doctor of Fine Arts (honoris causa) degree from NASCAD. In 2012, he received the Nova Scotia Masterworks Award.

Publications

References

1935 births
2021 deaths
Academic staff of NSCAD University
Canadian conceptual artists
Canadian contemporary artists
Members of the Order of Canada
University at Buffalo alumni
Governor General's Award in Visual and Media Arts winners
Canadian art educators
Artists from St. Catharines
Members of the Royal Canadian Academy of Arts